Rebekah Cilia (born 25 September 1987) is a Maltese Politician, and Engineer, currently serving as the Shadow Minister for lands and consumer rights. She also serves as a Member of Parliament in the Parliament of Malta.

Education 
Rebekah Cilia attained a 1st class degree in Electrical and Electronics Engineering from the University of Sheffield. She then went on to pursue a Masters of Science (MS) in Biomedical Engineering at the University of Oxford, where she was awarded the Medtronic Scholarship for demonstrating exceptional talent and promise in the field of Biomedical Engineering. Rebekah Cilia, after returning to Malta, worked as a Biomedical Engineer, while also studying for a postgraduate diploma in Building Services Engineering.

Rebekah Cilia then went on to obtain a Diploma in Journalism. She is currently reading for a Bachelor of Laws degree at the University of Malta.

Career 
Rebekah Cilia began her career in the public sector as a Biomedical Engineer, specialising in oncology equipment. She went on to work as the Technical Director of a local firm dealing in HVAC projects and equipment. Rebekah Cilia also worked part-time for a local newspaper as a journalist. Rebekah Cilia now works as a self-employed engineer in the building services industry.

Politics 
Rebekah Cilia’s introduction to politics came during her work as a journalist, where she interviewed several politicians and investigated a number of breaking stories.

In December 2020 she was approved as a general election candidate for the Nationalist Party on the 7th and 11th districts.

Rebekah Cilia contested the 2022 Maltese general election for the first time, obtaining 2078 votes from the 7th district and 1756 votes from the 11th district. Rebekah Cilia was elected to parliament through a casual election after Adrian Delia vacated his seat on the 7th district. Cilia was given the role of spokesperson responsible for Lands and Consumer rights and a member on the Lands Board representing the Opposition.

Rebekah Cilia held the position of Vice-President of the Forum Opportunitajiet Indaqs Partit Nazzjonalista (FOIPN), as well as representing the same forum on the Executive of the Nationalist Party.

References 

Nationalist Party (Malta) politicians
1987 births
Maltese women in politics
Alumni of the University of Sheffield
Alumni of the University of Oxford
University of Malta alumni
Members of the House of Representatives of Malta
Living people